The Harifal (Urdu حریفال  حریف ال) are a Pashtun tribe inhabiting the Sherani District in the Balochistan province of Pakistan, and, to a lesser extent, the surrounding districts of Afghanistan.  

The total voters of the Harifal tribe is numbered at 8,728, and gender-wise breakup is as follows: male: 4,797 and female: 3,931.

History
Under Arif's leadership, the Shiranis sent a portion of their tribe to occupy Bargha. Arif later married a Shirani women (according to tradition, his second wife and the mother of the Ibrahikhail sub-tribe), and thus became the eponymous ancestor of the Harifal tribe.

This account is corroborated by Olaf Caroe, who wrote that "the genealogies frequently supply actual confirmation of observable differences today."

An account of the warlike nature of the Harifal and Sherani tribes is given by the Scottish historian Mountstuart Elphinstone in his book An account of the kingdom of Caubul, and its dependencies in Persia, Tartary, and India: comprising a view of the Afghaun nation, and a history of the Dooraunee monarch, "The Sheeraunees [Sheranis] are at war with all the tribes that pass through their country in their annual migrations. They may, indeed, be said to be at war with all the world, since they plunder every traveller that comes within their reach; and besides, make incursions into parts of Damaun, with the inhabitants of which they have no quarrel. While I was in their neighbourhood, they stopped the body of a Dooraunee of rank, which was going through their country to be buried at Candahar, and detained it till a ransom had been paid for it."

Historical records
Mountstuart Elphinstone (1779–1859) says "The tribes of Hurreepaul (sic) and Kuppeep resemble the Sheeraunees, of which tribe they are branches; and their residence is in the hills and valleys at the western base of Tukhti Solimaun. To the north of the Hurreepaul is the country near the junction of the Gomul and Zhobe, sometimes pastured on by wandering Cankers. North of it is Wauneh, a low plain situated on the hills that slope down to the valley of the Gomul."

According to Baluchistan Through the Ages, "The Haripals claim a Saiad descent, and allege that their progenitor, Harif, was a Saiad from Pishin, who migrated to the Shirani country, married a Shirani woman, and was affiliated with the Shiranis".

Herbert Benjamin Edwardes says "It is by the Zirkunnee Pass that caravans go to Kandahar. About five or six miles to the south of the Zirkunnee Pass, is the Pass of Drabund, the mouth of which is about eight miles from Drabund itself. Not very far from midway between the town and the Pass of Drabund, but rather nearer to the latter, are ruins of the former fort of Akhoond Gool Hubeeb. This Akhoond, I was informed, belonged to a tribe called Hurrial, connected with the Sheraunees; the same probably as that of 'Hurreepaul,' mentioned by Mr. Elphinstone as a branch of the Sheraunees, residing 'in the hills and valleys at the western base of Tukht-e-Sulaiman'."

Qazi Abdul Haleem Asar Afghani (1910-1987), a well known Pashto writer (District Mardan, Tehsil Takht Bhai) holds that "Harifal is a minor tribe living in and around Daraban amongst Sheranis. In the twelfth generation of this tribe was a renowned saint by the name of Sheikh Ahmed Zinda-pir.

Sheikh Ahmed Zinda-pir had five sons; eldest among them was Sadar-ud-din, who later became famous by the name of Sheikh Sadar-ud-din Sadar Jahan; an erudite and noted Sufi saint. He migrated to India to spread the word of Islam. In India he reached "Malir Kotla and settled there. Sheikh later married daughter of Sultan Behlul Lodhi. This gave much impetus to his reputation. Stories of his erudition and piety spread far and wide and gradually Malerkotla became the seat of Sufism in India."

Shaikh Sadar Ud-din also known as Haidar Shaikh was born at Daraban, the winter dwellings of the Harifal tribe, in 1437. In 1449, he reached Multan and became the disciple of Baha-ud-din Zakariya. When his master was sure that his disciple was well versed in spirituality, he asked him to go out and help humanity. The Sheikh chose a raised mound near the old village of Maler to build his hut, and there he used to spend his time in prayer.

One distinguished member of this family was Zulfiqar Ali Khan who, although not a nawab, was a figure in the literary history of the riyasat. A close friend of allama Muhammad Iqbal, he was the author of the first biography of the famous poet, titled A Voice from the East.

Stanley Reed (28 January 1872 – 17 January 1969) was a British Conservative Party politician and an important figure in the media of India in the early 20th century. He claims; that Maler kotla's ruling family, though famed as Pathan, is actually Sayyid in its origin, for its ancestral progenitor was Sayyid Husain who migrated from Ghaur during the reign of caliph Abd al-Malik ibn Marwan (646–705 the 5th Umayyad Caliph) and settled in the region neighboring `Kooh-e-Sulaiman.

Geography

Harifal territory is situated 372 kilometers south west of the capital, Islamabad. The location is sparsely populated, with 21 people per square kilometer.

Weather and climate
Harifal territory is in a very strong (vii) earthquake zone, with occurrences of earthquakes at 6-7 on the Richter magnitude scale.
 
Harifal has an arid (0.05 - 0.2 p/pet) climate. Land area is not cultivated; most of the natural vegetation is still intact. The landscape is mostly covered with closed to open grassland. There is a moderate occurrence of periods with extreme drought. Additionally, flood risk is low.
 
The climate is classified as a subtropical steppe (low-latitude dry), with a subtropical thorn wood land biozone.
 
Weather varies according to the locality, and the heat or the cold is felt in different spots in the same latitude with very different degrees of intensity, according to the configuration of the country. Winter is mild; on the plain the snow melts as it falls, and does not lie long even on the summits of the mountains. In general the temperature is moderate. September is on average the month with most sunshine. Rainfall and other precipitation have no distinct peak month.

Villages
The following is a list of important local villages.

Zarkai Landawar: Located  in north Shinhar Harifal Union Council, known for its gardens of apples, apricot and grapes.

Kazha Malizai: Located in north Shinghar Harifal Union Council.

There are three intermittent streams in the vicinity of this village called Band Algad, Tawa Khwazha, and Pasta Khwara. Kazhha Malezai is populated by Malezai sub section of Harifal tribe. During the summer season they migrate to the upper highland area called Psha.

Tarai Malizai: Located in north Shinghar. This village is also populated by the Malizai sub-tribe of the Hasankhail Harifal. Various streams and mountains populate the area.  Pungai Oba, Satuna mountain, and Pastuke mountain are all within 4 km from Tarai Malaizai.

Qumai: Populated by Malizai. There are three important mountains; Pare Ghar, Tatai mountain, and Tabela ghar. Important streams are Lakarai and Sarwakai khwara. A ridge, Shache Kili, is situated four km from the village.

Ibrahimkhail: Ibrahimkhail is the centre of Harifal country and is located in north Shinghar Harifal.

Ragha Sir Nikan: Located in south Shinghar Harifal.

Draykhanzai: Located in south Shinghar.

Babakarzai

Bhaizhie: Located east of Shingar

References

Bettani Pashtun tribes
Sherani District
Pashto-language surnames
Pakistani names